Vahid Shamsaei (born 21 September 1975) is an Iranian professional futsal coach and former player. He was a Pivot and he scored 392 goals in international matches. He is currently head coach of Iran national futsal team.
Shamsaei has been named AFC Futsal Player of the Year on three occasions (2007, 2008 and 2015). He has also won eight AFC Futsal Championships with Iran. Shamsaei is regarded as the Ali Daei of futsal by the Asian Football Confederation.

International career 

He is the leading goalscorer for the national team, the seven time Top Goalscorer of the Asian Futsal Championship.

On 19 May 2007 after scoring one goal against Japan in Iran's 4–1 victory in the final of the 2007 AFC Futsal Championship, he scored his 316th national goal. He is officially the world's Top Futsal Goalscorer with 82 goals ahead of Manoel Tobias of Brazil national futsal team, the previous holder of the title with 302 goals.

Honours

Player 

Country
 AFC Futsal Championship
 Champion (8): 2000, 2001, 2002, 2003, 2004, 2005, 2007, 2008
 Third place (2): 2006, 2012
 Asian Indoor Games
 Champion (1): 2005
 Confederations Futsal Cup
 Champion (1): 2009
 WAFF Futsal Championship
 Champion (1): 2012

Club
 AFC Futsal Club Championship
 Champion (2): 2010 (Foolad Mahan) - 2015 (Tasisat Daryaei)
 Iranian Futsal Super League
 Champions (6): 2007–08 (Tam Iran Khodro) - 2008–09 (Foolad Mahan) - 2009–10 (Foolad Mahan) - 2013–14 (Dabiri) - 2014–15 (Tasisat Daryaei) - 2015–16 (Tasisat Daryaei)
 Runner-Up (5): 2004–05 (Eram Kish) - 2005–06 (Tam Iran Khodro) - 2011–12 (Giti Pasand) - 2017–18 (Tasisat Daryaei) - 2020–21 (Giti Pasand)

Manager 

 Iranian Futsal Super League
 Champions (2): 2014–15 (Tasisat Daryaei) - 2015–16 (Tasisat Daryaei)
 Runner-Up (2): 2017–18 (Tasisat Daryaei) - 2020–21 (Giti Pasand)

Iran
 AFC Futsal Championship: 2022 (Runner-Up)

Individual 

 Best player:
 AFC Futsal Player of the Year: 2007  - 2008 - 2015
 MVP AFC Futsal Championship: - 2000 - 2003 - 2007 - 2008
 MVP AFC Futsal Club Championship: 2010 - 2015
 MVP Futsal Confederations Cup : 2009
 International special award (2007–08) shared with Ali Daei (Iran Football Federation Award)
 Best futsal player of Iran (2007–08)
 Top Goalscorer
 World's Top Futsal Goalscorer of All Time (392 goals)
 AFC Futsal Championship: 2001 (31) - 2002 (26) - 2003 (24) - 2004 (32) - 2005 (23) - 2006 (16) - 2008 (13) - 2012 (7)
AFC Futsal Championship Top Goalscorer of All Time (194 goals) = 2000 (11) - 2001 (31) - 2002 (26) - 2003 (24) - 2004 (32) - 2005 (23) - 2006 (16) - 2007 (11) - 2008 (13) - 2012 (7)
 Asian Indoor Games: 2005 (31)
 AFC Futsal Club Championship, 2010 (17) - 2015 (10)
 WAFF Futsal Championship: 2012 (8 goals)
 Iranian Futsal Super League: 2000–01 (Peyman) (34 goals) - 2004–05 (Eram Kish) (38 goals) - 2005–06 (Tam Iran Khodro) (55 goals) - 2008–09 (Foolad Mahan) (32 goals) - 2009–10 (Foolad Mahan) (34 goals)

 Best Manager
 Iranian Futsal Super League: 2013–14  (Dabiri)
 Iranian Futsal Super League: 2014–15  (Tasisat Daryaei)

Managerial career

Statistics

References

External links 

 
 

1975 births
Living people
People from Tehran
Sportspeople from Tehran
Iranian men's futsal players
Futsal forwards
Sports world record holders
Esteghlal FSC players
S.S. Lazio Calcio a 5 players
Almas Shahr Qom FSC players
Tam Iran Khodro FSC players
Foolad Mahan FSC players
Giti Pasand FSC players
Dabiri FSC players
Tasisat Daryaei FSC players
Iranian restaurateurs
Iranian expatriate futsal players
Iranian expatriate sportspeople in Italy
Iranian expatriate sportspeople in China
Iranian futsal coaches
Giti Pasand FSC managers
Iran national futsal team managers
Player-coaches